opened in Chiba, Chiba Prefecture, Japan in 1974. The focus of the collection is the work of local artists and of artists with connections to Chiba, and it includes paintings by Asai Chū, Millais, Corot, and Antonio Fontanesi.

See also

 Kawamura Memorial DIC Museum of Art
 National Museum of Japanese History
 List of Historic Sites of Japan (Chiba)

References

External links
 Chiba Prefectural Museum of Art

Buildings and structures in Chiba (city)
Museums in Chiba Prefecture
Art museums and galleries in Japan
Prefectural museums
Art museums established in 1974
1974 establishments in Japan
Postmodern architecture in Japan